Odontobuthus is a genus of scorpions of the family Buthidae.

Species
 Odontobuthus bidentatus Lourenço & Pézier, 2002
 Odontobuthus doriae (Thorell, 1876)
 Odontobuthus odonturus (Pocock, 1897)

References

Buthidae